Puistolan Urheilijat (abbreviated PuiU) is a sports club from Helsinki, Finland specialising in football, badminton, tennis, volleyball, bowling and fitness. The club was formed in 1929 and currently has 1,400 members. The men's football first team currently plays in the Kolmonen (Third Division) and its home ground is at the Puistolan liikuntapuisto.

Background

PuiU was established in 1929 and has spent many seasons in the lower divisions of the Finnish football league.  The club has achieved one season in the third tier, the Kakkonen (Second Division,) in 2007 but their stay was short-lived as they were relegated at the end of the campaign.

The club is proud to have gained the Nuori Suomi -sinetti (Young Finland Seal) which recognises the quality of its youth work.  In Women's Football the club participated in the Naisten Liiga from 2007 until 2009 when they were relegated following a relegation play-off with Vasaan Sport.

The most famous youngster to progress from the club’s youth system is Petri Oravainen who has subsequently gained international honours.  In Women’s Football Laura Österberg Kalmari and Minna Mustonen are other notable internationals who started with PuiU.

Season to season

Club Structure
Puistolan Urheilijat run a large number of teams including 3 men's teams, 2 ladies teams, 10 boys teams and 7 girls teams.

2010 season
PuiU Men's Team are competing in Section 3 (Lohko 3) of the Kolmonen administered by the Uusimaa SPL.  This is the fourth highest tier in the Finnish football system.  In 2009 PuiU finished in 8th place in Section 1 (Lohko 1) of the Kolmonen.

 PuiU / 86 are competing in Section 2 (Lohko 2) of the Seiska (Seventh Division) administered by the Helsinki SPL.

References and Sources
Official Website
Finnish Wikipedia
Suomen Cup
PuiU Miehet 86 Facebook

Footnotes

Football clubs in Helsinki
1929 establishments in Finland